Surrey Herald of Arms Extraordinary was an English officer of arms.  Though an officer of the crown, Surrey Herald Extraordinary was not a member of the corporation of the College of Arms in London.  This office was created in 1856 and first held by Edward Stephen Dendy.  The badge of office was assigned in 1981.  The badge is blazoned Within a representation of a Herald's Collar of SS Argent a Tabard chequy Or and Azure.  These were the arms of John de Warenne, Earl of Surrey in the late thirteenth century, from whom the earldom descended through the Fitzalans to the Howard dukes of Norfolk and earls marshal.

Holders of the office

See also 
Heraldry
Herald
Officer of Arms

References
Citations

Bibliography
 The College of Arms, Queen Victoria Street : being the sixteenth and final monograph of the London Survey Committee, Walter H. Godfrey, assisted by Sir Anthony Wagner, with a complete list of the officers of arms, prepared by H. Stanford London, (London, 1963)
 A History of the College of Arms &c, Mark Noble, (London, 1804)

External links
The College of Arms
CUHGS Officer of Arms Index

English offices of arms